The 1 centas was a Lithuanian coin. It has been since replaced by the Euro.

References 

Coins of Lithuania
One-cent coins